Lucidota is a genus of fireflies in the beetle family Lampyridae. There are more than 160 described species in Lucidota.

See also
 List of Lucidota species

References

Further reading

External links

 

Lampyridae
Lampyridae genera
Bioluminescent insects
Articles created by Qbugbot